The Second Battle of Nola was fought in 215 BC between Hannibal's army and a Roman force under Marcus Claudius Marcellus.  It was Hannibal's second attempt to seize Nola after a failure the year before. He was again repelled and would make one more, also unsuccessful attempt the next year. For the Romans, it was a crucial success against Hannibal's army and give them hope that they could win the war.

See also

 
 

Nola 215 BC
Nola 215 BC
Nola
Nola (215 BC)